Carolina Alonso Alonso (born 17 October 1980) is a Spanish Podemos politician. She was elected to the Assembly of Madrid in the 2019 elections and has led the party there since 2021.

Biography
Born in Gijón, Asturias, Alonso graduated in Pedagogy from the University of Oviedo, and in Political Sciences from the University of the Basque Country.

In November 2016, she was elected to the Citizens' Council of Podemos in the Community of Madrid, as part of the sector backing Ramón Espinar Merino. During tensions in the party between leader Pablo Iglesias and Íñigo Errejón, she backed the former.

Alonso was placed seventh on Unidas Podemos's list for the 2019 Madrilenian regional election, led by Isabel Serra, and seven members were elected. She was again placed seventh in 2021, and ten members were elected.

After the 2021 Assembly of Madrid elections, Iglesias retired from politics after having led Podemos's list, and Serra resigned. Alonso then led the party in the legislature.

References

1980 births
Living people
People from Gijón
Politicians from Asturias
University of Oviedo alumni
University of the Basque Country alumni
Podemos (Spanish political party) politicians
Members of the 11th Assembly of Madrid
Members of the 12th Assembly of Madrid
Members of the Podemos Parliamentary Group (Assembly of Madrid)